Manisha Keer is an Indian sport shooter. She won a silver medal at the ISSF World Cup shotgun in Cairo in the team trap shooting along with Kirti Gupta and Rajeshwari Kumari.

References

1999 births
Indian female sport shooters
Living people